In the summer of 2013, there were several major wildfires in Colorado in the United States. During June and July, record high temperatures and dry conditions fueled the fires all across the state. By July 24, 570 structures had been destroyed and 2 people died. Below is a list of the major fires of the year.

West Fork Complex fire

The West Fork Complex Fire started on June 5, and consisted of three fires, all caused by lightning: the Windy Pass Fire, the West Fork Fire, and the Papoose Fire. The fire burned only one structure, and reached 109,615 acres as of July 23.

Ox Cart fire
On June 8, the Ox Cart fire began from lightning 9 miles north of Villa Grove in Saguache County. No structures were burned in the fire, which scorched 1,152 acres. As of July 3, it was 100% contained.

Big Meadows fire
The Big Meadows Fire started on June 10, about five miles north of Grand Lake, in Rocky Mountain National Park. The fire was caused by a lightning strike and was contained at 653 acres on June 24.

Royal Gorge fire

A fire started one mile west of Cañon City near the Royal Gorge Park, on June 11. The same day, the high winds caused the fire to jump the gorge into the park, resulting in the loss of 48 structures. The famous Royal Gorge Bridge suffered minor damage; only 32 of the planks on the deck were burned. During the fire, 905 inmates from the Colorado Territorial Correctional Facility were evacuated. 3,218 acres were burned as of June 17, and the cause remains unknown.

Black Forest fire

The same day as the Royal Gorge Fire, a fire was sparked near Shoup Road and Darr Drive in Black Forest. The fire quickly grew to  acres by the next day. It destroyed 511 homes, and took the lives of two people. The fire is currently the most destructive wildfire in Colorado history, surpassing the 2012 Waldo Canyon Fire, which destroyed 346 homes. The exact cause of the blaze is currently under investigation, but it is believed to be started by a human.

East Peak fire

The town of Walsenburg was put on pre-evacuation while the fire spread out of control after June 19. The blaze was caused by lightning.

Ward Gulch fire
The Ward Gulch Fire was caused by a lightning strike 3 miles north of Rifle Gap Reservoir on June 14.

Lime Gulch fire
The Lime Gulch Fire started on June 18 near Chair Rock, for which it was originally named, in Jefferson County near Buffalo Creek. The fire burned over the 2012 Lower North Fork burn scar. It was contained on June 23, and burned . The Lime Gulch Fire was started by lightning.

Wild Rose fire
The Wild Rose fire was caused by lightning, 21 miles south of Rangley on June 19. The fire burned  and was fully contained on June 23.

East Tschuddi fire
It burned  acres, and was 90% contained by July 27. No homes were threatened by the fire.

Citadel fire
Also northwest of Meeker, in Moffat County, the Citadel Fire was caused by a lightning strike on July 21. The fire burned  acres and was 90% contained as of July 27.

Red Canyon Fire
The Red Canyon fire started August 12 a couple miles south of Glenwood Springs. The cause is yet to be determined and lightning is suspected. It burned  and was 100% contained by August 16.

See also
List of Colorado wildfires

References

External links 
 Live blog: Colorado wildfires: Black Forest Fire, Royal Gorge Fire, Big Meadows fires, Denver Post

Wildfires in Colorado
2013 wildfires in the United States
2013 in Colorado